Alessandro Rossi (born 3 January 1997) is an Italian footballer who plays as a striker for  club Monterosi on loan from Lazio.

Club career

Lazio 
Product of Lazio's youth system, he made his Serie A debut for the senior team on 8 January 2017, as a substitute replacing Lucas Biglia in the 82nd minute of a 1–0 home win against Crotone at the Stadio Olimpico.

Loan to Salernitana 
On 18 August 2017, Rossi was signed by Serie B club Salernitana on a season-long loan deal. On 26 August he made his Serie B debut for Salernitana as a substitute replacing Riccardo Bocalon in the 88th minute of a 0–0 away draw against Venezia. On 9 September, Rossi played his first match as a starter in a 1–0 away defeat against Carpi, he was replaced by Alejandro Rodriguez in the 46th minute. On 24 October he played his first entire match for Salernitana, a 3–2 away win over Novara. On 4 November, Rossi scored his first professional goal in the 14th minute and he scored again in the 48th minute of a 2–2 home draw against Bari. Rossi ended his loan to Salernitana with 27 appearances, 2 goals and 3 assists.

Loan to Venezia
On 16 January 2019, Rossi joined on loan to Serie B club Venezia until 30 June 2019. Five days later, on 21 January he made his debut for Venezia in a 1–1 away draw against Spezia, he was replaced by Cristiano Lombardi in the 51st minute.

Loan to Juve Stabia
On 19 July 2019, Rossi joined Serie B club Juve Stabia on loan until 30 June 2020.

Loan to Viterbese
On 19 August 2020, Rossi moved on loan to Serie C club Viterbese.

Loan to Monopoli
On 4 January 2022, he joined Monopoli in Serie C on loan until the end of the season. Monopoli held an option to purchase his rights at the end of the loan (with a counter-option for Lazio to retain the rights) and an option to extend the loan further.

Loan to Monterosi
On 14 August 2022, Rossi was loaned by Monterosi.

International career
Rossi was a youth international for italy.

Career statistics

Club

Honours

Club 
Lazio Primavera

 Coppa Italia Primavera: 2014–15
 Supercoppa Primavera: 2015

References

1997 births
Living people
People from Viterbo
Sportspeople from the Province of Viterbo
Footballers from Lazio
Italian footballers
Association football forwards
Serie A players
Serie B players
Serie C players
S.S. Lazio players
U.S. Salernitana 1919 players
Venezia F.C. players
S.S. Juve Stabia players
U.S. Viterbese 1908 players
S.S. Monopoli 1966 players
Monterosi Tuscia F.C. players
Italy youth international footballers